Sarutani Dam is a concrete gravity dam located in Nara prefecture in Japan. The dam is used for power production. The catchment area of the dam is 214.9 km2. The dam impounds about 100  ha of land when full and can store 23300 thousand cubic meters of water. The construction of the dam was started in 1950 and completed in 1957.

References

Dams in Nara Prefecture
1957 establishments in Japan